Thandiwe is a given name. Notable people with the name include:

 Thandiwe Banda (born 1971/1972), Zambian political science teacher; First Lady of Zambia
 Thandiwe Mweetwa (born 1988), Zambian wildlife biologist and educator
 Thandiwe Newton (born 1972), English actress
 Thandiwe Zungu (born 1960), South African politician

Bantu-language given